Development of sexuality is an integral part of the development and maturation of children. It includes a range of sensory, emotional, and consequent sexual activities that may occur before or during early puberty, but before full sexual maturity is established. The development of child sexuality and the perception of child sexuality by adults is influenced by social and cultural aspects. The concept of child sexuality also played an important role in psychoanalysis.

Sexual development

Before puberty

The National Child Traumatic Stress Network issued a report in 2009 on child sexual development in the United States. The report asserted that children have a natural curiosity about their own bodies and the bodies of others that ought to be addressed in an age-appropriate manner. According to the report:
Children less than four years old will normally touch their own private parts, look at the private parts of others, and remove their clothes wanting to be nude;
Between ages four and six, children will be more actively curious. They will attempt to see others dressing or undressing, or will perhaps "play doctor".
Between ages six and twelve, children will expand their curiosity to images of undressed people available in the media. They will develop a need for privacy regarding their own bodies and begin to be sexually attracted to peers.
The report recommended that parents learn what is normal in regard to nudity and sexuality at each stage of a child's development and refrain from overreacting to their children's nudity-related behaviors unless there are signs of a problem (e.g. anxiety, aggression, or sexual interactions between children not of the same age or stage of development).

Children can discover the pleasure of genital stimulation naturally at an early age. Boys often lie on their stomachs and girls may sit and rock. Manual stimulation occurs about the time of adolescence and mutual masturbation or other sexual experimentation between adolescents of similar ages may also occur, though cultural or religious coercion may inhibit or occult such activity if there is negative peer pressure or if authority figures are likely to disapprove.

From the ages of three to seven, the following behaviors are normal among children:
Children are curious about where babies come from.
Children may explore other children's and adults' bodies out of curiosity.
By age four, children may show significant attachment to the opposite-sex parent.
Children begin to have a sense of learned modesty and of the differences between private and public behaviors.
For some children, genital touching increases, especially when they are tired or upset.

Early school age covers approximately ages five to seven, and masturbation is common at these ages. Children become more aware of gender differences, and tend to choose same-sex friends and playmates, even disparaging the opposite sex. Children may drop their close attachment to their opposite-sex parent and become more attached to their same-sex parent.

During this time, children, especially girls, show increased awareness of social norms regarding sex, nudity, and privacy. Children may use sexual terms to test adult reaction. "Bathroom humor" (jokes and conversation relating to excretory functions), present in earlier stages, continues.

"Middle childhood" covers the ages from about six to eleven; depending on the methodology and the behavior being studied, individual development varies considerably.

As this stage progresses, the choices of children picking same-sex friends becomes more marked and extending to disparagement of the opposite sex.

By the age of 8 or 9 children become aware that sexual arousal is a specific type of erotic sensation and will seek these pleasurable experiences through various sights, self-touches, and fantasy.

Although there are variations between individual children, children are generally curious about their bodies and those of others, and explore their bodies through explorative sex play. "Playing doctor" is one example of such childhood exploration; such games are generally considered to be normal in young children. Child sexuality is considered fundamentally different from adult sexual behavior, which is more goal-driven. Among children, genital penetration and oral-genital contact are very uncommon, and may be perceived as imitations of adult behaviors. Such behaviors are more common among children who have been sexually abused.

A 1997 study based on limited variables found no correlation between early childhood (age 6 and under) peer sexual play and later adjustment. The study notes that its results do not demonstrate conclusively that no such correlation exists. The study also does not address the question of consequences of intense sexual experiences or aggressive or unwanted experiences.

Childcare 
In childcare settings outside the home there is difficulty in determining what behavior is normal and what may be indicative of child sexual abuse (CSA). In 2018 an extensive study of Danish childcare institutions (which had, in the prior century, been tolerant of child nudity and playing doctor) found that contemporary policy had become restrictive as the result of childcare workers being charged with CSA. However, while CSA does occur, the response may be due to "moral panic" that is out of proportion with its actual frequency and over-reaction may have unintended consequences. Strict policies are being implemented not to protect children from a rare threat, but to protect workers from the accusation of CSA. The policies have created a split between childcare workers who continue to believe that behaviors involving nudity are a normal part of child development and those that advocate that children be closely supervised to prohibit such behavior.

Between puberty and adulthood

Contemporary issues
In the latter part of the 20th century, sexual liberation probably arose in the context of a massive cultural explosion in the United States of America following the upheaval of the Second World War, and the vast quantity of audiovisual media distributed worldwide by the new electronic and information technology. Children are apt to gain access and be influenced by material, despite censorship and content-control software.

Sex education 

The extent of sex education in public schools varies widely around the world, and within countries such as the United States where course content is determined by individual school districts.

A series of sex education videos from Norway, intended for 8–12 year olds, includes explicit information and images of reproduction, anatomy, and the changes that are normal with the approach of puberty. Rather than diagrams or photos, the videos are shot in a locker room with live nude people of all ages. The presenter, a physician, is relaxed about close examination and touching of relevant body parts, including genitals. While the videos note that the age of consent in Norway is 16, abstinence is not emphasized. As of 2015, however, 37 U.S. states required that sex education curricula include lessons on abstinence and 25 required that a "just say no" approach be stressed. Studies show that early and complete sex education does not increase the likelihood of becoming sexually active, but leads to better health outcomes overall.

Sexualization of children 
Some cultural critics in the Western world have postulated that over recent decades, children have been subject to a premature sexualization, as indicated by a level of sexual knowledge or sexual behavior inappropriate for their age group. The causes of this premature sexualization that have been cited include portrayals in the media of sex and related issues, especially in media aimed at children; the marketing of products with sexual connotations to children, including clothing; the lack of parental oversight and discipline; access to adult culture via the internet; and the lack of comprehensive school sex education programs.
For girls and young women in particular, studies have found that sexualization has a negative impact on their "self-image and healthy development".

Child sexual abuse

Child sexual abuse is defined as an adult or older adolescent having a sexual relationship with a child. Effects of child sexual abuse include clinical depression, post-traumatic stress disorder, anxiety, propensity to further victimization in adulthood, and physical injury to the child, among other problems.

Child sexual abuse by a family member is a form of incest, and can result in more serious and long-term psychological trauma, especially in the case of parental incest.

Children who have been the victim of child sexual abuse sometimes display overly sexualized behavior, which may be defined as expressed behavior that is non-normative for the culture. Typical symptomatic behaviors may include excessive or public masturbation and coercing, manipulating or tricking other children into non-consensual or unwanted sexual activities, also referred to as "child-on-child sexual abuse". Sexualized behavior is thought to constitute the best indication that a child has been sexually abused.

Children who exhibit sexualized behavior may also have other behavioral problems. Other symptoms of child sexual abuse may include manifestations of post-traumatic stress in younger children; fear, aggression, and nightmares in young school-age children; and depression in older children.

Among siblings

In 1980, a survey of 796 undergraduates, 15 percent of females and 10 percent of males reported some form of sexual experience involving a sibling; most of these fell short of actual intercourse. Approximately one quarter of these experiences were described as abusive or exploitative. A 1989 paper reported the results of a questionnaire with responses from 526 undergraduate college students in which 17 percent of the respondents stated that they had preadolescent sexual experiences with a sibling.

Methodological issues
Empirical knowledge about child sexual behavior is not usually gathered by direct interviews of children, partly due to ethical consideration. Information about child sexual behavior is gathered by the following methods:

Observing children being treated for problematic behavior, such as use of force in sex play, often using anatomically correct dolls;
Recollections by adults;
Observation by caregivers.

Most published sexual research material emanates from the Western World, and a great deal of dramatic audio-visual material which might influence social attitudes to child sexuality are generated either in the United States of America or else for that audience. "Normative" may therefore relate to Western culture rather than to the general complexity of human experience.

Historical studies

Freud
Until Sigmund Freud published his Three Essays on the Theory of Sexuality in 1905, children were often regarded as asexual, having no sexuality until later development. Freud was one of the first researchers to seriously study child sexuality, and his acknowledgment of its existence was a significant change. Children are naturally curious about their bodies and sexual functions –  they wonder where babies come from, they notice anatomical differences between males and females, and many engage in genital play or masturbation. Child sex play includes exhibiting or inspecting the genitals. Many children take part in some sex play, typically with siblings or friends. Sex play with others usually decreases as children go through their elementary school years, yet they still may possess romantic interest in their peers. Curiosity levels remain high during these years, escalating in puberty (roughly the teenage years) when the main surge in sexual interest occurs.

Kinsey
Alfred Kinsey in the Kinsey Reports (1948 and 1953) included research on the physical sexual response of children, including pre-pubescent children (though the main focus of the reports was adults). While there were initially concerns that some of the data in his reports could not have been obtained without observation of or participation in child sexual abuse, the data was revealed much later in the 1990s to have been gathered from the diary of a single pedophile who had been molesting children since 1917.  This effectively rendered the data-set nearly worthless, not only because it relied entirely on a single source, but the data was hearsay reported by a highly  unreliable observer. In 2000, Swedish researcher Ing-Beth Larsson noted, "It is quite common for references still to cite Alfred Kinsey", due to the scarcity of subsequent large-scale studies of child sexual behavior.

See also

Adolescent sexuality
Age of consent
Developmental psychology

References

Further reading
 
 
 
 
 
 
 
 

 
Childhood
Sexuality and age

fr:Sexualité infantile (psychanalyse)